`Aynat is a village in eastern Yemen. It is located in the Hadhramaut Governorate.

External links
Towns and villages in the Hadhramaut Governorate
Photos of `Aynat at the American Center of Research

Populated places in Hadhramaut Governorate
Villages in Yemen